Paracaristius is a genus of fish in the family Caristiidae, the manefishes. It is a small genus with mostly newly described species.

Fish in this genus are separated from similar taxa by the arrangement of their teeth. They have compressed heads with very short snouts, small mouths, and two nostrils. The body is oval to rectangular. The lateral line is not visible. The dorsal fin extends along nearly the whole top edge of the body, and the pectoral fin is "delicate" and "fan-like".

Neocaristius heemstrai has since been moved from Paracasistius and placed in a new genus of its own.

Species
There are currently four recognized species in this genus:
 Paracaristius aquilus D. E. Stevenson & Kenaley, 2011
 Paracaristius maderensis (Maul, 1949)
 Paracaristius nemorosus D. E. Stevenson & Kenaley, 2011
 Paracaristius nudarcus D. E. Stevenson & Kenaley, 2011

References

Caristiidae